The men's featherweight event was part of the weightlifting programme at the 1932 Summer Olympics. The weight class was the lightest contested, and allowed weightlifters of up to 60 kilograms (132 pounds). The competition was held on Sunday, 31 July 1932. Six weightlifters from four nations competed.

Medalists

Records
These were the standing world and Olympic records (in kilograms) prior to the 1932 Summer Olympics.

No world or Olympic record was bettered at this Games. Raymond Suvigny equalized the standing world record in total with 287.5 kilograms.

Results

All figures in kilograms.

References

Sources
 Olympic Report
 

Featherweight